Behind Closed Doors is a 2003 Television Film.

Plot
Holly, Kara and Brian Phillips move to a new area. Soon after arriving Holly befriends her 11-year-old neighbor and she starts to suspect the boy is being beaten by his mother's boyfriend.

Cast
 Tilly Gerrard - Holly Phillips 
 Liam Noble - Brian Phillips 
 Victoria Willing - Kara Phillips 
 Aaron Johnson - Sam Goodwin 
 Caroline O'Neill - Nikki Goodwin 
 James Thornton - Joe Healy 
 Natasha Dawson - Cassie Hall 
 Vicky Elliott - Alex 
 Michael Hayes - Simon 
 Julie-Anne Blythen - Miss Williams 
 Marc Small - Case Officer 
 Sakuntala Ramanee - Nurse

References

External links
 

2003 television films
2003 films
British television films